Charlotte Rothwell is a British actress. She was born Charlotte Lucy Rothwell in Southport, Merseyside on 11 August 1991, as the only child of Sharon Venetta Rothwell and the first child of Adam Marc Turk. She attended Farnborough Road School and later Merchant Taylors' School for Girls in Crosby, Liverpool until 2009.
Charlotte's stepfather Paul Nolan was a police officer who died in a tragic drowning accident in the Maldives on 14 February 2006. Her mother, Sharon, was rescued. Charlotte has spoken about this being a defining point in her life.

Charlotte moved to Los Angeles in August 2010 after being offered a coveted place at the prestigious American Academy of Dramatic Arts in Hollywood. Upon her graduation in 2012, she was cast as the leading role of Senoa in the feature film thriller Senoa, directed by Roger Mahler. Charlotte also did her own stunt work in the film. Shortly after wrapping filming on Senoa, Charlotte played the lead role of Marcella in Adaora Nwandu's film Book Worms, which was featured at Clermont-Ferrand International Film Festival. She was also cast in Lifetime Movie Network's hit show My Crazy Ex as Real Grace, as well as Murder Book on Investigation Discovery. She has recently been confirmed to star in Inocencia, written by James Barnes and directed by Yvonne McDevitt. Charlotte was invited to join BAFTA - Los Angeles as one of their Newcomers of the Year and 'One's To Watch', and has since been a proactive member of the BAFTA - LA Community Education and Outreach Program. She was also a judge on the panel of the BAFTA - LA Student Film Awards in 2014 and 2015, as well as a judge for the BAFTA - LA Washington Prep Film Festival in 2014, 2015 and 2016.

References

External links 
 

1991 births
Living people
British film actresses
British television actresses
21st-century British actresses